Thora (minor planet designation: 299 Thora) is a 17 km Main belt asteroid with a potentially long 274-hour rotation period. It was discovered by Johann Palisa on 6 October 1890 in Vienna.

This object has a very low rate of spin, requiring  to complete a full rotation.

References

External links
 
 

Background asteroids
Thora
Thora
Slow rotating minor planets
18901006